Links 2004 is a golf simulation computer game by Microsoft for the Xbox. It is the final game in the Links series, and follows Links 2003. It was also part of Microsoft's XSN Sports lineup.

Gameplay
The game supports from one to four players, system link of 2-4 players, Dolby 5.1 Surround sound, custom soundtracks, HDTV 480p, and Xbox Live Scoreboard and online play. It also featured simultaneous online play - referred to as Stroke "Fast Play" - where each player could complete the hole at their own pace and not have to wait their turns.

Release
Links 2004 was released in the United States on November 11, 2003. A downloadable course of Hawaii's Kapalua Plantation was made available through Xbox Live in early 2004.

Reception

Links 2004 received "generally favorable reviews" according to the review aggregation website Metacritic. In Japan, where the game was ported for release on March 25, 2004, Famitsu gave it a score of one eight, one six, and two sevens for a total of 28 out of 40.

References

External links

2003 video games
Golf video games
Sports video games set in the United States
Video games developed in the United States
Video games set in the United Kingdom
Xbox games
Xbox-only games